C.M.S St. John's High School is the oldest school in Nadia district and Sixth oldest educational institution in the Indian State of West Bengal. This school is situated in Krishnanagar, Nadia.

History
In the 18th century, in order to spread the English education and missionaries works Church Missionary Society established some societies which were mostly controlled by the Church. Such Missionary work started in Nadia in 1832 by the C.M.S.Committee and C.M.S St. John's High School was established in 1834 by German Christian Missionaries. Rev. W.Deerr and Rev. Blumhardt founded the School at Krishnagar town. It was established even before the Krishnagar Municipality and Krishnagar Government College.

Notable alumni
 Chanchal Kumar Majumdar

See also
Education in India
List of schools in India
Education in West Bengal

References

External links 

Schools in Colonial India
High schools and secondary schools in West Bengal
Schools in Nadia district
Educational institutions established in 1834
1834 establishments in British India
Krishnanagar